Ezras Torah may refer to:
 The Ezras Torah Fund, a Jewish American charitable organization
 Ezrat Torah, a neighborhood in Jerusalem
 Ezrat Torah St., the neighborhood's main street